Fast Lane is an optional, pay-per-person line queue system offered on select rides at Cedar Fair amusement parks. The system provides shorter lines, and guests who want access must pay a fee in addition to general park admission. They are given a wristband for identification, and an unspecified, limited number are sold each day to control wait times. First piloted in 2011 at Kings Island, the system was rolled out to the rest of the Cedar Fair chain in 2012. An upgrade called Fast Lane Plus featuring additional rides is available at some parks.

History
On July 18, 2011, Kings Island announced the introduction of Fast Lane, a separate line queue featuring shorter wait times. The upcharge for access during its debut year was $50 per person, and the purchase did not include park admission. It was also only active from noon until 7:00PM originally, but the system was later expanded to all-day availability. Cedar Fair wanted to test the system before deploying to every location, and Kings Island was chosen for that purpose. Fast Lane received positive feedback, and it generated nearly $1 million in half a season. Cedar Fair deemed it a success and decided to roll out Fast Lane to the rest of their parks in 2012. Cedar Fair's Fast Lane differs from the virtual queue system utilized at some competing parks such as Disney's Lightning Lane, which allows guests to reserve their place in line without actually standing in line.

Fright Lane, a Halloween version of Fast Lane, is also available during the fall season at Cedar Fair parks. In 2013, Canada's Wonderland, Carowinds, Cedar Point, Kings Dominion, and Kings Island introduced an upgraded tier called Fast Lane Plus, which adds a few additional rides not available to the standard Fast Lane tier. Dorney Park and Worlds of Fun followed suit in 2014, introducing Fast Lane Plus for water park attractions at Wildwater Kingdom and Oceans of Fun.

In 2017, Michigan's Adventure launched a season pass add on which allowed users to receive a fast lane wristband every time they visit. This was later expanded to the other Cedar Fair parks in 2018 and 2019. Some parks in the Cedar Fair chain also offer Fast Lane during the Christmas season, often featuring a smaller number of rides due to limited ride operation.

Process
Visitors purchase Fast Lane access at the park or online, individually or as a group, with group pricing offering a lower price per group member. Access provides a wrist band to guests that allows them to enter the Fast Lane line queue at attractions that support it. The amount of Fast Lane wrist bands sold per day is restricted to help control wait times.

Reception
The priority queuing system was originally controversial. An earlier version implemented at Cedar Point in the early 2000s allowed guests to enter a virtual queue, similar to Disney's FastPass at the time, where riders would return to a ride several hours later and skip to the front of the line. The system was first called Ticket to Ride and was later renamed FreeWay. It was discontinued in 2004 due to negative reception, as guests were uncomfortable with the park "sanctioning line-jumping". Fast Lane received higher marks when assessed internally by Cedar Fair, and the system has been in place at all Cedar Fair parks since 2012.

List of Fast Lane attractions

California's Great America
:

Canada's Wonderland
:

Carowinds
:

Cedar Point
:

Dorney Park & Wildwater Kingdom
:

Kings Dominion
:

In the winter Carousel is added to the Fast Lane list as many rides are closed.

Kings Island
:

Knott's Berry Farm
:

Michigan's Adventure
:

Schlitterbahn Galveston
:

Schlitterbahn New Braunfels
:

Valleyfair
:

Worlds of Fun

:

See also
 Disney's Fastpass, a virtual queue system for Disney Parks
 Universal Express Pass, a secondary queue system for Universal parks

References

Cedar Fair